This is a list of candidates for the 1922 New South Wales state election. The election was held on 25 March 1922. The election was the second of three conducted under the system of proportional representation.

Retiring Members

Labor
Arthur Buckley MLA (Sydney)
John Estell MLA (Newcastle) — appointed to the Legislative Council

Nationalist
James Macarthur-Onslow MLA (Eastern Suburbs) — elected as Progressive

Legislative Assembly
Sitting members are shown in bold text. Successful parties are highlighted in the relevant colour. Successful candidates are indicated by an asterisk (*).

See also
 Members of the New South Wales Legislative Assembly, 1922–1925
 Results of the 1922 New South Wales state election

Notes

References

1922